VA-44, nicknamed the Hornets, was an Attack Squadron of the US Navy. The squadron was established as Fighter Squadron VF-44 on 1 September 1950, and redesignated VA-44 on 1 January 1956. It was disestablished on 1 May 1970. It was the second squadron to be designated VA-44, the first VA-44 was disestablished on 8 June 1950.

Operational history

On 13 June 1953 the squadron conducted its first combat operations against targets in Korea.
September–October 1957: During the squadron’s deployment aboard , its mission was temporarily changed from attack to a fighter role in order to provide air protection for the VS squadrons operating from the carrier.
1 June 1958: The squadron’s mission changed from a light attack squadron to a fleet replacement training squadron. The new mission involved flight training for pilots and maintenance training for enlisted personnel. Under this concept, pilots and enlisted personnel ordered to East Coast fleet A4D squadrons completed the course of instruction provided by VA-44 before reporting to their assigned fleet squadrons.
6 June 1958: Fleet All Weather Training Unit Detachment ALFA, an instrument training detachment, was disestablished and its personnel and aircraft were transferred to VA-44.
8 August 1958: The squadron graduated its first replacement pilot under the new training program for attack pilots.
January 1959: The squadron’s first AD Skyraiders arrived and preparations began for the additional mission of replacement training for this aircraft, plus the A4D Skyhawk.
15 November 1961: The squadron graduated the 1,000th enlisted maintenance trainee on the A4D Skyhawk.
15 February 1963: The propeller training section of the squadron was removed from VA-44 and established as a separate squadron and designated VA-45. VA-44 continued in its training mission concentrating on A-4 Skyhawk training. It became a strictly jet squadron flying A-4Bs, A-4Cs and TF-9Js.

Home port assignments
The squadron was assigned to these home ports, effective on the dates shown:
 NAS Jacksonville – 01 Sep 1950
 NAAS Cecil Field – 19 Sep 1950
 NAS Jacksonville – 13 Oct 1952
 NAS Cecil Field – 18 Feb 1963

Aircraft assignment
The squadron first received the following aircraft on the dates shown:
 F4U-5 Corsair – Sep 1950
 F4U-4 Corsair – 01 Dec 1951
 F2H-2 Banshee – Dec 1953
 F9F-8 Cougar – Apr 1956
 F9F-8T Cougar – 23 Jan 1958
 A4D-1 Skyhawk – 04 Feb 1958
 TV-2 Shooting Star – Jun 1958
 T28-B Trojan – Jun 1958
 A4D-2/A-4B Skyhawk – Sep 1958
 A-1E and H Skyraider – Jan 1959
 A4D-2N/A-4C Skyhawk – 09 Feb 1960
 A-4E Skyhawk – Oct 1964
 TA-4F Skyhawk – 03 Aug 1966
 A-4F Skyhawk – Nov 1969
 A-4L Skyhawk – Dec 1969

See also
Attack aircraft
List of inactive United States Navy aircraft squadrons
History of the United States Navy
List of aircraft carriers
List of United States Navy aircraft wings

References

Attack squadrons of the United States Navy
Wikipedia articles incorporating text from the Dictionary of American Naval Aviation Squadrons